Vemanapally is a Mandal in Mancherial district in the state of Telangana, in south India.

Administrative Division 
There are 30 Villages in Vemanpally.

References 

te:వేమన్‌పల్లి
Mandals in Mancherial district